The Hawaii Wing of Civil Air Patrol (CAP)(Puka Ahahui Hauoli) is the highest echelon of Civil Air Patrol in the state of Hawaii. Hawaii Wing headquarters is located in Honolulu, Hawaii. The Hawaii Wing consists of over 600 active cadet and adult members at over 10 locations across the state of Hawaii.

Mission
Civil Air Patrol performs three primary missions: providing emergency services; offering cadet programs for youth; and providing aerospace education for both CAP members and the general public.

Emergency services
Civil Air Patrol provides emergency services, including search and rescue and disaster relief missions and assisting in humanitarian aid assignments across the state. The CAP also provides Air Force support through conducting light transport, communications support, and low-altitude route surveys. They also offer support on counter-drug missions with the Department of Homeland Security, Customs and Border Protection, etc. The Hawaii Wing performs tsunami and tropical cyclone warning missions on the ground as well as in the air mounting warning sirens on their Cessna's, as well as urban direction finding.

Cadet programs
Civil Air Patrol offers cadet programs for youth aged 12 to 21, which includes a sixteen step program offering training in aerospace education, leadership training, physical fitness and moral leadership. The Hawaii Wing actively participates in many public events, often volunteering with the help of cadets inside the community. Currently, there is 1 Cadet Squadron located at Maryknoll School in Honolulu.

Aerospace education
Civil Air Patrol provides aerospace education by offering training to the members of the CAP, and offering workshops for youth throughout the nation through schools and public aviation events. Furthermore, cadets are offered 10 orientation flights throughout their career within CAP often flying Cessna's and Blanik gliding aircraft.

Organization

The Hawaii Wing maintains its headquarters in Honolulu and has 10 squadrons located across the state. Furthermore, the Hawaii Wing Civil Air Patrol is Headquartered near Lagoon Drive off the Eastern end of Daniel K. Inouye International Airport.

See also 
Hawaii Air National Guard
Hawaii Territorial Guard

References

External links
Hawaii Wing Civil Air Patrol official website

Wings of the Civil Air Patrol
Education in Hawaii
Military in Hawaii